José Fernández Arteaga (12 September 1933 – 17 December 2021) was a Mexican prelate of the Catholic Church who served as archbishop of Chihuahua. He previously served as the bishop of Apatzingán from 1974 to 1980 and Colima from 1980 to 1988.

References

External links

1933 births
2021 deaths
People from Michoacán
21st-century Roman Catholic archbishops in Mexico
20th-century Roman Catholic bishops in Mexico